The World Mixed Curling Championship is the world championship for mixed curling. It is held annually in the autumn, and replaced the European Mixed Curling Championship.

Results
The results are listed as follows:

All-time medal table
As of 2022 World Mixed Curling Championship

References

External links
World Curling Federation

 
Mixed